WVJS (1420 AM) is an American radio station licensed to serve the community of Owensboro, Kentucky. The station is owned and operated by Hancock Communications, Inc., doing business as the Cromwell Radio Group.

History 
WVJS programming began November 27, 1947, from studios located at 324 Allen Street in downtown Owensboro. The station's transmitter building and multi tower directional array were located on a 26-acre tract of land on U.S. Highway 60, just west of the Owensboro city limits. The station operated at 1420 kilocycles with 1,000 watts of power. The following year WVJS-FM went on the air at 96.1 megacycles.

The stations were owned and operated by Owensboro on the Air, Incorporated. Owensboro developer Vincent J. Steele was majority owner. Owensboro radio veteran Malcolm Greep, who was a driving force in starting WVJS, was named general manager of the new station.

In early 1960, WVJS closed its downtown studios on Allen Street and consolidated all of its operations at the company's transmitting site on Highway 60. The station began play-by-play coverage of the Kentucky Wesleyan College basketball games in 1961. In 1962, WVJS was granted FCC approval to boost daytime power to 5,000 watts. In 1963, the station's FM call letters were changed to WSTO and it became Kentucky's first full-time stereo broadcasting station.

In 1973, Owensboro on the Air was granted a franchise by the city to provide cable television service to Owensboro and a new building to house Owensboro Cablevision was constructed at the company's Highway 60 site.

In 1983, V.J. Steele's heirs sold WVJS, WSTO and the cable TV operations to Century Communications Corporation of New Canaan, Connecticut. At the end of 1996, Century sold WVJS and WSTO to Brill Media which already owned Owensboro stations WOMI and WBKR. WSTO was later sold to South Central Communications of Evansville, Indiana.

In 2002, WVJS was purchased by its current owner, Cromwell Radio Group, and shares facilities at 1115 Tamarack Road in Owensboro, with the following stations: Philpot-licensed WBIO, Whitesville-licensed WXCM, Hawesville-licensed WKCM, Lewisport-licensed WLME, Cannelton, Indiana-licensed WCJZ and Tell City, Indiana-licensed WTCJ.

Programming
WVJS broadcasts a mix of oldies and classic hits music format to the greater Owensboro, Kentucky, area. Programming features the "Kool Gold" syndicated format from Dial-Global.

WVJS GENERAL MANAGERS (1947-1997) Malcolm Greep, Ray Wettstain, Corky Norcia and Steve Cooke.

WVJS COMMERCIAL MANAGERS (1947-1997) Jack McLean, John Rutledge, Parker Smith, Joe Fife, Dennis Keller, Corky Norcia.

WVJS PROGRAM DIRECTORS (1947-1997) Lee Meredith, Earl Fisher, Jim Orton, Joe Lowe.

WVJS NEWS DIRECTORS (1947-1997) Joe Bell, Gerry Wood, Joel Utley, Jim Parr, Mike Whitsett, Scott Douglas, Jerry Birge.

STATION SLOGANS (1947-1997) "Radio Center"; "Sparkle Radio"; "The Big Sound"; "Radio-One";
"The Station You Depend On"; "Oldies 1420"; "The News Station".

Translators
WVJS programming is also carried on a broadcast translator station to extend or improve the coverage area of the station.

References

External links
WVJS official website

VJS
Owensboro, Kentucky
Oldies radio stations in the United States
Radio stations established in 1947
1947 establishments in Kentucky